The Battle of Toulouse was fought between the Visigoths and the Western Roman Empire in 439. Having previously defeated the Visigoths at Narbonne, the Roman general Litorius led his largely Hunnic army against Toulouse, the capital of the Visigothic Kingdom. During the siege, the Visigothic king Theodoric I attacked the Roman camp and inflicted heavy casualties. Litorius was captured and executed. Since the Visigoths also suffered heavy losses, Theodoric made peace with the Roman governor Avitus.

See also
 Battle of Toulouse (458)

Sources
 

439
Toulouse
Toulouse
Toulouse
Toulouse